Wola Rogowska  is a village in the administrative district of Gmina Wietrzychowice, within Tarnów County, Lesser Poland Voivodeship, in southern Poland.

The village has an approximate population of 500.

References

Wola Rogowska